Spiritchaser are a South African musical duo best known for 2011 number one South African hit single "These Tears" co-produced and written with UK artist Est8  and licensed to Sony Music Entertainment (Africa) in 2011 and featured on Now! That's What I Call Music 56 (South Africa). The record spent over 38 Weeks in the South African ‘Media Guide Top Ten retaining number one spot for over an 8 week period. This led to a tour of South Africa playing on the same bill as South African DJ Black Coffee live at The Vodacom Unlimited Experience in Durban on Friday, 16 December 2011. The piano from "These Tears" was subsequently used by Johannesburg born and SAHHA nominated music producer Makwa in Kwesta's follow-up 2018 number one hit record in South Africa called Spirit which was Certified Platinum by RISA and nominated for the South African Music Awards. "These Tears" was also used in the CBS television series Ringer in 2012.

References

External links 
 
 

South African musical duos
Deep house musicians
Living people
Year of birth missing (living people)